William Taylor (5 June 1898–1965) was an English footballer who played in the Football League for Aberdare Athletic, Aldershot,  Cardiff City, Hull City and Norwich City.

References

1898 births
1965 deaths
English footballers
Association football forwards
English Football League players
West Bromwich Albion F.C. players
Redditch United F.C. players
Stourbridge F.C. players
Cardiff City F.C. players
Aberdare Athletic F.C. players
Hull City A.F.C. players
Norwich City F.C. players
Llanelli Town A.F.C. players
Aldershot F.C. players